The year 1974 involved some significant events in television. Below is a list of television-related events of that year.

Events
January 6 – CKGN-TV begins broadcasting in Brantford, Ontario.
January 31 – CBS airs a multi-Emmy-winning adaptation of Ernest J. Gaines' novel The Autobiography of Miss Jane Pittman, which follows the 110-year life of a former slave from the Civil War to the Civil Rights Movement.  Cicely Tyson portrays the title role.
February 1 – KITC (now KIVI-TV) begins broadcasting in Boise, Idaho.
February 2 – The Filipino government television station GTV 4 (now known as the People's Television Network) begins operations, under the National Media Production Center.
February 8 – After 20 years, The Secret Storm airs its 5195th and final episode on CBS Daytime. The show is replaced ten days later by Tattletales, a game show hosted by Bert Convy.
March 11 – The children's special Free to Be... You and Me, produced by comedic actress Marlo Thomas, airs on ABC.
March 13 – The Execution of Private Slovik airs on NBC. A made-for-television film, it told the story of Pvt. Eddie Slovik, the only American soldier to be executed for desertion since the American Civil War.
March 18 – Lucille Ball ends her 23-year consecutive television reign when Here's Lucy is cancelled.
April 5 – After 264 hour-long episodes, The Dean Martin Show ends its run on NBC, then spins off to 10 years of The Dean Martin Celebrity Roast.
April 6 – "Waterloo" wins the Eurovision Song Contest for Sweden and launches ABBA on their stellar global career.
May 4 – Steve Frame (George Reinholt) marries Alice Matthews (Jacqueline Courtney) for the second time on a special hour-long broadcast of Another World, coinciding with the show's tenth anniversary.
June 8 – Jon Pertwee makes his final regular appearance as the Third Doctor in the concluding moments of Part Six of the Doctor Who serial Planet of the Spiders. Tom Baker briefly appears as the Fourth Doctor at the conclusion of this serial.
August 5 – For the first time on a pre-school children's programme, the UK show Inigo Pipkin covers the death of the main character, Inigo, as the actor who played him (George Woodbridge) had died. The show is renamed Pipkins.
August 8 – US President Richard Nixon announces pending resignation (effective August 9) live on television.
September 10 – The controversial TV movie Born Innocent, starring Linda Blair, airs on NBC.  The film, which involved a fourteen-year-old being sent to what the television preview deemed a women's prison (when in reality it was a reform school), drew heavy criticism due to an all-female rape scene, the first ever seen on American television. The scene was deleted in subsequent re-airings after a group of girls assaulted an eight-year-old with a pop bottle, influenced by the scene in the film.
October 6 – Monty Python's Flying Circus, the popular British sketch comedy which aired its final episode this year, is first shown in the U.S. on KERA-TV in Dallas, Texas, at 10pm.
December 28 – Tom Baker makes his first full appearance as the Fourth Doctor in the Doctor Who serial Robot.
On the American soap opera Love of Life, Meg Dale (Tudi Wiggins) calls her son Ben (Christopher Reeve) a "bastard", the first time a profanity was spoken on American daytime television.

Programmes
60 Minutes (1968–present)
All in the Family (1971–1979)
All My Children (1970–2011)
American Bandstand (1952–1989)
Another World (1964–1999)
Are You Being Served? (UK) (1972–1985)
As the World Turns (1956–2010)
Barnaby Jones (1973–1980)
Blue Peter (UK) (1958–present)
Bozo the Clown (1949–present)
Candid Camera (1948–present)
Captain Kangaroo (1955–1984)
Clyde Frog Show (1974–1976)
Columbo (1971–1978)
Come Dancing (UK) (1949–1995)
Coronation Street (UK) (1960–present)
Crossroads (UK) (1964–1988, 2001–2003)
Cutey Honey (Japan) (1973–1974)
Dad's Army (UK) (1968–1977)
Days of Our Lives (1965–present)
Dixon of Dock Green (UK) (1955–1976)
Doctor Who (UK) (1963–1989, 1996, 2005–present)
Emergency! (1972–1977)
Emmerdale Farm (UK) (1972–present)
Face the Nation (1954–present)
Fat Albert and the Cosby Kids (1972–1984)
Four Corners (Australia) (1961–present)
General Hospital (1963–present)
Grandstand (UK) (1958–2007)
Gunsmoke (1955–1975)
Hallmark Hall of Fame (1951–present)
Hawaii Five-O (1968–1980)
Hee Haw (1969–1993)
Ironside (1967–1975)
It's Academic (1961–present)
It Ain't Half Hot Mum (UK) (1974–1981)
Jeopardy! (1964–1975, 1984–present)
John Craven's Newsround (UK) (1972–present)
 Kaynanalar (Turkey) (1974–2004)
Kojak (1973–1978)
Kung Fu (1972–1975)
Last of the Summer Wine (UK) (1973–present)
Love of Life (1951–1980)
Magpie (UK) (1968–1980)
Majokko Megu-chan (Japan) (1974–1975)
Mannix (1967–1975)
Marcus Welby, M.D. (1969–1976)
Mary Tyler Moore (1970–1977)
M*A*S*H (1972–1983)
Masterpiece Theatre (1971–present)
Match Game '74 (1962–1969, 1973–1984, 1990–1991, 1998–1999)
Maude (1972–1978)
McCloud (1970–1977)
McMillan & Wife (1971–1977)
Meet the Press (1947–present)
Monday Night Football (1970–present)
Old Grey Whistle Test (UK) (1971–1987)
One Life to Live (1968–2012)
Opportunity Knocks (UK) (1956–1978).
Panorama (UK) (1953–present)
Play for Today (UK) (1970–1984)
Play School (Australia) (1966–present)
Sanford and Son (1972–1977)
Schoolhouse Rock! (1973–2009)
Search for Tomorrow (1951–1986)
Sesame Street (1969–present)
Soul Train (1971–2008)
Space Battleship Yamato (Japan) (1974–1975)
Superstars (UK) (1973–1985)
The Benny Hill Show (UK) (1969–1989)
The Bob Newhart Show (1972–1978)
The Carol Burnett Show (1967–1978)
The Dean Martin Show (1965–1974)
The Doctors (1963–1982)
The Edge of Night (1956–1984)
The Good Old Days (UK) (1953–1983)
The Guiding Light (1952–2009)
The Late Late Show (Ireland) (1962–present)
The Lawrence Welk Show (1955–1982)
The Mike Douglas Show (1961–1981)
The Money Programme (UK) (1966–present)
The Odd Couple (1970–1975)
The Price Is Right (1972–present)
The Six Million Dollar Man (1973–1978)
The Sky at Night (UK) (1957–present)
The Today Show (1952–present)
The Tomorrow Show (1973–1982)
The Tonight Show Starring Johnny Carson (1962–1992)
The Waltons (1972–1981)
The Wonderful World of Disney (1969–1979)
The Young and the Restless (1973–present)
This Is Your Life (UK) (1955–2003)
Top of the Pops (UK) (1964–2006)
Truth or Consequences (1950–1988)
What the Papers Say (UK) (1956–present)
World of Sport (UK) (1965–1985)
Z-Cars (UK) (1962–1978)

Debuts
January 5 – Tiswas, a local programme in the Midlands (ATV) in the UK, though not fully automatically networked through ITV until 1979 (1974–82)
January 7 
How to Survive a Marriage in a 90-minute special on NBC daytime
Jackpot! (1974–75), a game show hosted by Geoff Edwards on daytime NBC
 Wish You Were Here...? premieres on ITV (1974–2003, 2007–)
January 15 – Happy Days on ABC (1974–84)
February 1 – Good Times (a spinoff of Maude) on CBS (1974–79)
February 10 – Apple's Way on CBS (1974–1975) 
February 12 – Bagpuss (12 February – 7 May 1974)
February 18 – Tattletales, hosted by Bert Convy, on CBS daytime (1974–78, 1982–84)
March 3 – Nova on PBS (1974–present)
March 13 –  Clyde Frog Show on PBS (1974–1976)
April 12 – Ultraman Leo on TBS in Japan (1974–75)
May 6 – The $10,000 Pyramid moves to ABC, with Dick Clark as host
July 1
High Rollers on NBC (1974–76; 1978–80)
Winning Streak on NBC daytime
July 4 – CBS airs its first Bicentennial Minute (They will continue until the end of 1976)
July 29 – Name That Tune on NBC daytime with Dennis James hosting, and in nighttime syndication with Tom Kennedy hosting
September 4 – That's My Mama on CBS (1974–1975)
September 7 (Saturday)
Land of the Lost on NBC (1974–77)
Valley of the Dinosaurs on CBS (1974–76)
Shazam! on CBS (1974–77)
Hong Kong Phooey on ABC (1974)
September 9 (Monday)
Rhoda on CBS (1974–78)
The $25,000 Pyramid in syndication with host Bill Cullen; basically The $10,000 Pyramid with larger prizes
Definition on CTV daytime (1974–89)
Dinah! in syndication (1974–80)
September 11 – Little House on the Prairie on NBC (1974–83)
September 12
Harry O on ABC (1974–76)
Paper Moon on ABC (1974)
September 13 (Friday)
Chico and the Man (1974–78) on NBC
The Rockford Files (1974–80) on NBC
Police Woman (1974–78) on NBC
The Texas Wheelers (1974) on ABC
Kolchak: The Night Stalker  (1974–75) on ABC
Planet of the Apes (1974) on CBS
September 14 (Saturday)
The New Land (1974) on ABC
Paul Sand in Friends and Lovers (1974–75) on CBS
September 23 – Dr. Zonk and the Zunkins on CBC (1974–75)
October 20 – Derrick, German Krimi written by Herbert Reinecker, starring Horst Tappert, on ZDF (1974–1988)
November 8 – Countdown on the Australian Broadcasting Corporation (1974–87)
December 23 – The Big Showdown and The Money Maze on ABC daytime
Unknown date – House of Pride on CBC (1974–76)

Ending this year

Births

Deaths

See also
 1974–75 United States network television schedule

References